Nanohammus myrrhatus is a species of beetle in the family Cerambycidae. It was described by Francis Polkinghorne Pascoe in 1878.

References

Lamiini
Beetles described in 1878